Michael Rohde (born August 26, 1959) is an American chess grandmaster and attorney-at-law.

Rohde was rated as a master at thirteen. He gained the International Master title in 1976, followed by that of Grandmaster in 1988. At one point, he was ranked as high as 59th in the world.

In 1975 he was the National Scholastic Chess Champions Junior High School Champion, and the following year he was the High School Champion. He won first place in the U.S. Open in 1991 as well as several other titles. He wrote the "Game of the Month" column for Chess Life from 1991 to 2006.

In August 2007, Rohde tied for first in the U.S. Open Championship in Cherry Hill, New Jersey.

As of right now, he works at success academy as a chess teacher.

References

External links
NY Masters

"CHESS; Rohde Wins Brilliancy and a Double Prize," 1/24/88

1959 births
Living people
20th-century American Jews
Chess grandmasters
American chess players
Jewish chess players
21st-century American Jews